Béni-Mellal is a province in the Moroccan region of Béni Mellal-Khénifra. Its population in 2004 was 946,018.

Geography
Béni Mellal Province is located in the Atlas Mountains with a plateau situated 400 to 600 meters above sea level, as well as mountains rising to 2,460 meters (Mount Ighnayen) and 2,240 meters (Mount Tassemit). The high mountains are covered with snow from November to April.

Beni Mellal Province has a continental climate with rainfall varying between 350 and 650 mm depending on the year. November is the rainiest month, with almost 25% of the annual precipitation. Snow is not uncommon on the plateau in winter. Extreme temperatures on the plateau range from a -6 °C in January 2005 to a 47 °C in July 2007.  The summer is normally very hot because of the burning easterly or southeasterly winds, known as chergui, which blow off the Sahara and raise the temperature above 40 °C. The heat waves sometimes end in violent thunderstorms.

Settlements
The major cities and towns are: 
 Aghbala
 Beni Mellal
 El Ksiba
 Kasba Tadla
 Oulad M Barek
 Oulad Yaich
 Sidi Jaber
 Zaouiat Cheikh

Other towns and settlements include:
 Tartemat

Subdivisions
The province is divided administratively into the following:

References

 
Béni-Mellal Province